Ivanovskaya is a rural locality (a village) in Mishutinskoye Rural Settlement, Vozhegodsky District, Vologda Oblast, Russia. The population was 1 as of 2002.

Geography 
The distance to Vozhega is 77.7 km, to Mishutinskaya is 21.7 km. Isakovo, Fatyanovo, Ozyorny are the nearest rural localities.

References 

Rural localities in Vozhegodsky District